Erik Sandbraathen (born 9 January 1951) is a former Norwegian Paralympic ice sledge racer, cross-country skier, and ice sledge hockey player. He won medals for Norway at the 1984 Winter Paralympics, 1988 Winter Paralympics, 1994 Winter Paralympics, 1998 Winter Paralympics, 2002 Winter Paralympics.

References

Living people
Paralympic sledge hockey players of Norway
Norwegian sledge hockey players
Paralympic bronze medalists for Norway
Paralympic silver medalists for Norway
Paralympic gold medalists for Norway
1951 births
Medalists at the 1980 Winter Paralympics
Medalists at the 1984 Winter Paralympics
Medalists at the 1988 Winter Paralympics
Medalists at the 1994 Winter Paralympics
Medalists at the 1998 Winter Paralympics
Medalists at the 2002 Winter Paralympics
Cross-country skiers at the 1988 Winter Paralympics
Paralympic medalists in cross-country skiing
Paralympic medalists in sledge hockey
Skiers from Oslo